A hereditary CNS demyelinating disease is a demyelinating central nervous system disease that is primarily due to an inherited genetic condition. (This is in contrast to autoimmune demyelinating conditions, such as multiple sclerosis, or conditions such as central pontine myelinolysis that are associated with acute acquired insult.)

Examples include:
 Alexander disease
 Canavan disease
 Krabbe disease
 leukoencephalopathy with vanishing white matter
 megalencephalic leukoencephalopathy with subcortical cysts
 metachromatic leukodystrophy
 X-linked adrenoleukodystrophy

References

External links 

Demyelinating diseases of CNS